Finland competed at the 1976 Winter Olympics in Innsbruck, Austria.

Medalists

Alpine skiing

Women

Biathlon

Men

 1 One minute added per close miss (a hit in the outer ring), two minutes added per complete miss.

Men's 4 x 7.5 km relay

 2 A penalty loop of 200 metres had to be skied per missed target.

Cross-country skiing

Men

Men's 4 × 10 km relay

Women

Women's 4 × 5 km relay

Figure skating

Men

Ice hockey

First round
Winners (in bold) entered the Medal Round. Other teams played a consolation round for 7th-12th places.

|}

Medal round

Czechoslovakia 2-1 Finland
Finland 5-3 West Germany
USA 5-4 Finland
USSR 7-2 Finland
Finland 7-1 Poland
Team roster
Matti Hagman
Reijo Laksola
Antti Leppänen
Henry Leppä
Seppo Lindström
Pekka Marjamäki
Matti Murto
Timo Nummelin
Esa Peltonen
Timo Saari
Jorma Vehmanen
Urpo Ylönen
Hannu Haapalainen
Seppo Ahokainen
Tapio Koskinen
Pertti Koivulahti
Hannu Kapanen
Matti Rautiainen
Head coaches: Seppo Liitsola & Lasse Heikkilä

Nordic combined 

Events:
 normal hill ski jumping 
 15 km cross-country skiing

Ski jumping

Speed skating

Men

Women

References
Official Olympic Reports
International Olympic Committee results database
 Olympic Winter Games 1976, full results by sports-reference.com

Nations at the 1976 Winter Olympics
1976
W